The Married Woman is an Indian Hindi-language, romantic drama web series featuring Ridhi Dogra, Monica Dogra, Suhaas Ahuja, and Imaad Shah. Directed by Sahir Raza and produced by Juggernaut Productions, this web series is currently streaming on ALTBalaji and ZEE5. The trailer was released at a launch event in Mumbai on 13 February 2021. It is based on Manju Kapur's book, A Married Woman.

Synopsis 

It is a story of two women, Astha and Peeplika, set in the backdrop of the 90s, where Astha is a dutiful housewife and a mother. Peeplika is an unconventional artist and has never been impressed by normal routines in her life. Astha sets out on a journey of self-discovery and meets Peeplika on the route. Astha sets herself free from the society pressures and boundaries when she finds an intense connection with Peeplika, something that she always longed for. All this happens amidst the riots after Babri Masjid demolition horrified the nation.

Cast 

 Ridhi Dogra as Astha
 Suhaas Ahuja as Hemant
 Monica Dogra as Peeplika
 Imaad Shah as Aijaz
 Nadira Babbar as Hemant's Mother
 Rahul Vohra as Hemant's Father
 Ayesha Raza as Babbo
 Samridhi Dewan as Timsi
 Nabeel Ahmed as Mudassar
 Divya Seth as Peeplika's Mother
 Sangeeta Balachandran as Garima Jain (Astha's Mom)

Episode List

Reception 
Sweta Kaushal from Hindustan Times feels the show is a stereotypical act. It is all about politics and religion and the one which is heard mostly. She simply summarizes the review in the title: "Melodrama and Monologue kills the charm". Actors Riddhi and Monika Dogra have tried their best to act in spite of limited scope.

Archika Khurana of The Times of India feels it is "A millieu of good performances challenging societal norms." The critics rating on TOI is 3/5 and average user rating goes to 3.5/5. The review ends with a solid line that says, "'The Married Woman' takes too long to make its point heard but it is the performances that hold your attention throughout".

Shubham Kulkarni from koimoi.com says, "Ridhi Dogra's Performance Is The Only Hook In A Show That Talks About Homosexuality In The Daily Soap Way". He concludes the review saying, "The Married Woman ends up being yet another soap opera made with some gen Z elements for the digital arena". Rating: 2.5 stars.

References 

Hindi-language web series
Indian LGBT-related web series